Richland Township is one of the twenty-one townships of Tama County, Iowa, United States.

History
Richland Township was organized in 1854.

References

Townships in Tama County, Iowa
Townships in Iowa